Bootleg is the fourth album by Kenshi Yonezu, released on November 1, 2017. It is his first album with Sony Music and won the Album of the Year award at the 60th Japan Record Awards.

Background 
August 30, 2017 is the ten year anniversary of Hatsune Miku, while Magical Mirai is the large Vocaloid concert held by Crypton Future Media. Crypton Future Media invited Kenshi to write "Dune" as the birthday song for Miku and also as the theme song of Magical Mirai 2017. Miku's version is included in "Hatsune Miku "Magical Mirai 2017" OFFICIAL ALBUM ", which peaked No.13 in Oricon. While Kenshi self-covers the song in "Bootleg". The song reviews the history of Vocaloid with references to previous songs in the lyrics and metaphorizes the desertion of the Vocaloid community as a sand planet, soonly became viral in Vocaloid fandom. Besides, Crypton Future Media also invited some notable Vocaloid producers, such as Wowaka and N-buna, to write song and collected as birthday celebrating album "Re:Start" which peaked No.6 on Oricon.

Yonezu considered titling the album Dune as he was confident that he could make beautiful music, and want to prove it to people. He later decided to use Bootleg as the title.

Singles
"Dune" is the theme song of Magical Mirai 2017, with the album version having Kenshi Yonezu as the lead vocalist with Hatsune Miku in the background rather than the other way around in the single release. The song "Peace Sign" was used as a first opening theme for the second season of the anime My Hero Academia, and also the song "orion" was used as a second ending theme of the anime March Comes in Like a Lion. Uchiage Hanabi is served as theme song of Fireworks.

Track listing

Charts

Weekly charts

Year-end charts

References 

2017 albums
Kenshi Yonezu albums